Naphthablin is a naphthoquinone compound with the molecular formula C29H36O8 which is produced by the bacterium Streptomyces aculeolatus.

References 

Heterocyclic compounds with 4 rings
Oxygen heterocycles
Esters
Alcohols